The  Magellanic Cloud (Polish title: Obłok Magellana) is a 1955 science fiction novel by Polish writer Stanisław Lem. Fragments of the novel were published earlier, in 1953 and 1954, in the magazine Przekrój. Some significant literary tropes featured in the novel include interstellar travel, "first contact", psychological fiction, a Communist utopia, and criticism of the capitalist militarism, which Lem himself characterized as an "extract of the times of Socialist realism".

In 1963, the novel was adapted into the Czechoslovak film Ikarie XB-1.

Plot summary
The novel is set in the 32nd century, in a communistic Utopian future. Humanity has colonized all of the Solar System, and is now making its first attempt at interstellar travel.

Aboard a vessel called Gaia, 227 men and women leave the Earth for the Alpha Centauri system.

After almost eight years of travel, they find signs of organic life on a planet orbiting Proxima Centauri, possibly originating on another planet within the Centauri system.
 
The expedition meets an old artificial war satellite of the United States and its NATO allies. It was carrying still active biological weapons and nuclear warheads, which had accidentally left Earth orbit and got lost in space during the Cold War era, and the team destroys it.

Gaia detects a radar signal directed at it, coming from one of the planets of Alpha Centauri. "Gaia" approaches this planet and tries to contact its civilization, but all messages remain unanswered. When they attempt to land on a planet, they are unexpectedly attacked, and 10 astronauts are killed. Nevertheless, the crew of Gaia does not strike back, supposing the inhabitants of the planet mistook a peaceful landing for aggression.  Eventually the contact was established.

Censorship and criticisms 
When the novel was first published, parts of it were censored by the Communist authorities. Lem  denounced the censored version, calling it too optimistic about Communism.  A complete version was published in the 1990s in post-Communist Poland.

Because at the time of writing cybernetics was a banned "bourgeois pseudoscience", Lem invented the term  mechaneurystyka ("mechanheuristics").

References

External links
 
 Obłok Magellana at Library of Congress

Alpha Centauri in fiction
Novels by Stanisław Lem
1955 novels
1955 science fiction novels
Space exploration novels
Fiction set around Proxima Centauri
Polish novels adapted into films